Shamokin Area High School is a small, rural/suburban, public high school operated by Shamokin Area School District. It is the sole high school operated by the district. The building is labeled Shamokin Area Middle–High School.

Facilities
The middle/high school building houses grades 7 through 12. The building was constructed in 1973–1975. The multi-floor building houses a 1280-seat auditorium, a 3000-seat gymnasium, and a regulation pool with spectator seating. This building was renovated in 1995–1996 to provide additional classroom space to accommodate grades 7 and 8. The building's HVAC system was renovated in this project, and modifications were made to meet American Disabilities Act (ADA) regulations.

Extracurriculars
Shamokin Area High School offers a variety of clubs, activities and an extensive sports program. The Shamokin Area School District is a member of the Pennsylvania Heartland Athletic Conference. The Pennsylvania Heartland Athletic Conference is a voluntary association of 25 PIAA High Schools within the central Pennsylvania region.

Shamokin Area High School has a student-run television program. SATV covers school events and sports broadcasting via the internet and a local cable television network. The school also operates a chapter of the National Honor Society.

Shamokin Area High School is also a member of FBLA, Future Business Leaders of America.  They currently hold second place for the Largest Percentage Increase in Local Chapter Membership.

The Shamokin High School Alumni association was established in 1883.

Sports
Shamokin Area School District maintains an extensive outdoor athletic complex. Kemp Memorial Stadium is a large football and track complex with a seating capacity of 6000, with artificial turf and lighting for night games. The outdoor athletic complex also features practice fields, a lighted soccer stadium, and a baseball field that is dedicated to Douglas Dobson. The athletic facilities of the district are utilized not only by the home teams, but also by various league organizations for hosting playoff games and events. Weight room and athletic training facilities are located in the middle/high school.

The district funds:

Boys
Baseball - AAAA
Basketball - AAAA
Cross Country - AA
Football - AAAA
Soccer - AAA
Swimming and Diving - Class AA
Track and Field - AAA
Wrestling - AA
Bocce Ball - AA

Girls
Basketball - AAAA
Cheer - AAAAAA
Cross Country - AA
Soccer (Fall) - AAA
Softball - AAAA
Swimming and Diving - AA
Track and Field - AAA
Volleyball - AAA
Bocce Ball - AA

According to PIAA School Directory July 2017

Notable alumni
 Tony Deppen, professional wrestler

References

High schools in Central Pennsylvania
Public high schools in Pennsylvania
Schools in Northumberland County, Pennsylvania
Susquehanna Valley